Moonlight Waltz is an album by Italian band Theatres des Vampires

Ceramics
Moonlight Waltz, List of Royal Doulton figurines  2007

Music
"Moonlight Waltz", by	Frankie Yankovic And His Yanks  	Groller, Yankovic Jr.	1959
"The moonlight waltz", by Joe Burke (composer) 1934
"Lonesome Moonlight Waltz", by	Bill Monroe	1972 DGQ-20 Bluegrass Album, Vol. 6 – Bluegrass Instrumentals
 "Misty Moonlight Waltz", by O'Connor Soppin' the Gravy
"Golden Moonlight Waltz", Candy Mountain Boys 	1959 Fortune Records